Kathryn McGarry is a Canadian politician who was the 6th mayor of Cambridge from 2018 to 2022. Prior to her election as mayor, she represented the riding of Cambridge in the Legislative Assembly of Ontario from 2014 to 2018. She was a minister in the Cabinet of Premier Kathleen Wynne. In 2023, McGarry was elected president of the Ontario Liberal Party.

Background
McGarry began her career as a critical care nurse in 1978, working first at the Hospital for Sick Children, as well as Grand River Hospital and Cambridge Memorial hospital.

McGarry was a founding member of Hospice Waterloo Region; past president of the Heritage Cambridge Board of Directors; and past chair of the Heritage Master Plan Implementation Committee. She is a member of the Waterloo Region Crime Prevention Council, and was a contributing member of the Community Leaders' Task Force on Municipal Restructuring. McGarry has been a recipient of the YWCA Woman of Distinction Award for voluntary, community and humanitarian service, and the Bernice Adams Special Trustee award.

Provincial politics
In the 2007 provincial election, McGarry vied as the Liberal candidate in the riding of Cambridge. She was defeated by Progressive Conservative incumbent Gerry Martiniuk by 3,238 votes. McGarry ran a second time in the 2011 provincial election but was defeated by a reduced margin of 1,954 votes to new PC candidate Rob Leone. McGarry ran a third time in 2014, this time defeating Leone by 3,067 votes.

On June 24, 2014, McGarry was named Parliamentary Assistant to the Minister of Transportation, and given responsibility for drafting the province's driverless car regulation, reforming the province's intercity bus system and strengthening cycling and road safety.

On November 20, 2014, McGarry introduced a private member's bill, The Lung Health Act 2014, which called for the development and implementation of a comprehensive Ontario Lung Health Action Plan covering research, prevention, diagnosis and treatment of lung disease.

On June 13, 2016, McGarry was appointed Minister of Natural Resources and Forestry. She introduced and passed legislation that increased accountability and oversight of Ontario’s 36 Conservation Authorities. 
She also introduced the Aggregate Resources and Mining Modernization Act, which modernized the province's resource extraction rules by updating processes for fee and royalty increases on aggregates, expanded public participation in the extraction application process and enhanced environmental protections through clearer regulations and better oversight for aggregate companies.

In a cabinet shuffle on January 18, 2018, McGarry was named Minister of Transportation. As Minister, McGarry announced the government would conduct a feasibility study to extend GO Transit rail service to Cambridge, connecting the city to the Kitchener line through Guelph via a currently unused CN Rail owned track.

McGarry lost her re-election bid in the 2018 provincial election to Belinda Karahalios.

In 2023, she announced that she would run for president of the Ontario Liberal Party. She was elected president at the party's convention in March 2023.

Cabinet positions

Municipal politics
On July 18, 2018, McGarry announced that she was running for Mayor of Cambridge, Ontario, stating that the people of the city were no longer satisfied with Craig's leadership style, and pledged to run city hall in a more communicative and consultative manner. During the campaign, Craig was forced to apologize to McGarry when his campaign staff edited her out of a photograph of a public event they had both attended while McGarry was still sitting in the Legislative Assembly. On October 22, 2018, McGarry was elected Mayor of Cambridge, defeating 18 year incumbent Doug Craig as well as three other candidates with 13,404 votes and 47.7% of the vote, becoming the first candidate in the city's history to defeat an incumbent mayor.

She was defeated by Jan Liggett in the 2022 municipal election.

Election results

References

External links
 Official website
 

Living people
21st-century Canadian politicians
21st-century Canadian women politicians
Canadian nurses
Canadian women nurses
Members of the Executive Council of Ontario
Ontario Liberal Party MPPs
Women MPPs in Ontario
Women government ministers of Canada
Place of birth missing (living people)
Year of birth missing (living people)
Mayors of Cambridge, Ontario
Women mayors of places in Ontario
Ontario provincial political party presidents